Indascia is a genus of hoverflies native to India and Sri Lanka. Indascia is very similar to Paramicrodon.

Species
The four known species are:
I. brachystoma (Wiedemann, 1924)
I. gigantica Reemer, 2013
I. gracilis Keiser, 1958
I. spathulata Reemer, 2013

References

Hoverfly genera
Diptera of Asia
Microdontinae